Richard Glenn Fraser  (born February 13, 1972) is a Canadian politician who was an elected member to the Legislative Assembly of Alberta representing the electoral district of Calgary-South East.

Elected as a Progressive Conservative Association of Alberta MLA in 2012, Fraser initially joined the rest of the PC caucus in its merger with the Wildrose Party to form the United Conservative Party in 2017. He left the caucus on September 21, 2017, to sit as an Independent due to his dissatisfaction with the party's leadership contest and the emphasis put by candidates on spending cuts and austerity.

He was sworn into the Redford cabinet in 2013 as Minister of Public Safety.

Fraser registered his candidacy for the leadership of the Alberta Party on December 30, 2017. He officially announced his candidacy on January 9, 2018, and also joined the Alberta Party caucus.

Electoral history

2019 general election

References

Living people
Members of the Executive Council of Alberta
Paramedics
Politicians from Calgary
Progressive Conservative Association of Alberta MLAs
1972 births
21st-century Canadian politicians
United Conservative Party MLAs
Alberta Party MLAs